The Istanbul Biennial is a contemporary art exhibition that has been held biennially in Istanbul, Turkey, since 1987. The Biennial has been organised by the Istanbul Foundation for Culture and Arts (IKSV) since its inception.

Format
Istanbul Biennial adheres to an exhibition model in which the curator, appointed by an international advisory board, develops a conceptual framework according to which a variety of artists and projects are invited to the exhibition. After the first two biennials realized under the general coordination of Beral Madra in 1987 and 1989, IKSV decided to commission a different curator for each edition, starting with the 1992 Istanbul Biennial directed by Vasif Kortun.

Istanbul's 13th biennial in 2013 was overtaken by political events; its theme was art in public spaces but was forced to retreat indoors after many of the scheduled venues filling with plumes of tear gas and water cannon as police and demonstrators clashed had been tuned into a battleground between demonstrators trying to protect the city's Gezi Park.

The 2015 edition presented new works by more than 50 visual artists as well as oceanographers and neuroscientists.

Past biennials

1987 - Contemporary Art in Traditional Spaces. General Coordinator: Beral Madra
1989 - Contemporary Art in Traditional Spaces. General Coordinator: Beral Madra
1992 - Production of Cultural Difference. Director: Vasif Kortun
1995 - Orient-ation – The Image of Art in a Paradoxical World. Curator: René Block
1997 - On Life, Beauty, Translations and Other Difficulties. Curator: Rosa Martinez
1999 - The Passion and the Wave. Curator: Paolo Colombo
2001 - Egofugal – Fugue from Ego for the Next Emergence. Curator: Yuko Hasegawa
2003 - Poetic Justice. Curator: Dan Cameron
2005 - İstanbul. Curators: Charles Esche and Vasif Kortun
2007 - Not Only Possible, But Also Necessary: Optimism in the Age of Global War. Curator: Hou Hanru
2009 - What Keeps Mankind Alive?. Curators: WHW / What, How & for Whom
2011 - Untitled. Curators: Adriano Pedrosa and Jens Hoffmann
2013 - Mom, am I barbarian? Curator: Fulya Erdemci
2015 - SALTWATER: A Theory of Thought Forms. Drafter: Carolyn Christov-Bakargiev
2017 - A Good Neighbour. Curators: Elmgreen & Dragset
2019 - The Seventh Continent. Curators: Nicolas Bourriaud
2022 - (postponed 2021 biennial) Untitled. Ute Meta Bauer, Amar Kanwar and David Teh

Past participating artists

9th Istanbul Biennial, 2005

12th Istanbul Biennial, 2011
The 12th Istanbul Biennial was curated by Jens Hoffmann and Adriano Pedrosa, and ran from September 17 – November 13, 2011. The shows spanned two buildings at Istanbul's Antrepo.

Group exhibitions 

 "Untitled" (Ross)
 "Untitled" (History)
 "Untitled" (Abstraction)
 "Untitled" (Passport)
 "Untitled" (Death by Gun)

Solo artists

Past venues
The 2009 biennial took place at three venues on the European side of the city: Antrepo, or warehouse, No. 3 in Tophane; the Tobacco Warehouse, also in Tophane; and the Feriköy Greek School, in Şişli. All of the art selected for the 2011 edition was shown at one central location, in Warehouses No. 3 and 5 next to the Istanbul Modern museum.

See also
Istanbul Modern
Istancool
Art exhibition
Proje4L / Elgiz Museum of Contemporary Art
Dogancay Museum

References

External links

Contemporary art exhibitions
Culture in Istanbul
Turkish contemporary art
Art biennials
1987 in art
1987 establishments in Turkey
Recurring events established in 1987